The Cincinnati Reds Radio Network is an American radio network composed of 69 radio stations which carry English-language coverage of the Cincinnati Reds, a professional baseball team in Major League Baseball (MLB). Cincinnati station WLW (700 AM) serves as the network's flagship; WLW also simulcasts over a low-power FM translator. The network also includes 68 affiliates in the U.S. states of Ohio, Indiana, Kentucky, North Carolina, Tennessee and West Virginia: fifty-three AM stations, thirty-nine of which supplement their signals with one or more low-power FM translators, and fifteen full-power FM stations.

From 2007 through 2019, Marty Brennaman and Jeff Brantley served as the network's primary play-by-play announcers. Brennaman announced in January 2019 that he would retire at the end of the 2019 season, his 46th calling Reds games. He broadcast his final Reds game on September 26, 2019. Brennaman was replaced by Tommy Thrall beginning with the 2020 season. Thrall had begun calling some games during the 2018 season, alternating with Brennaman and Brantley.

In addition to traditional over-the-air AM and FM broadcasts, network programming airs on SiriusXM satellite radio and streams online via SiriusXM Internet Radio, TuneIn Premium, and MLB.com Gameday Audio. Cincinnati Bell has naming rights of the network.

Programming
Play-by-play announcers Tommy Thrall, Jeff Brantley call games on-site. All regular season and most spring training games are broadcast.

Station list

Blue background indicates low-power FM translator.

Network map(s)

See also
List of current MLB broadcasters
 List of XM Satellite Radio channels
 List of Sirius Satellite Radio stations

References

Cincinnati Reds
Mass media in Cincinnati
Major League Baseball on the radio
Sports radio networks in the United States
Cincinnati Bell